Mimene melie is a butterfly of the family Hesperiidae. It is endemic to New Guinea.

References

Hesperiinae
Butterflies described in 1895
Endemic fauna of New Guinea